Presidential elections were held in Bolivia on 6 May 1917, electing a new President of the Republic and two Vice Presidents.

Results

President

First Vice President

Second Vice President

References

Presidential elections in Bolivia
Bolivia
Legislative election
May 1917 events
Election and referendum articles with incomplete results